Akio Miyazawa ( Miyazawa Akio; 9 December 1956 – 12 September 2022) was a Japanese playwright, writer, and academic.

Biography

In 1990, Miyazawa founded the theatre company . His book, Search Engine System Crash, earned him the Akutagawa Prize and the Mishima Yukio Prize. In 1993, he received the Kishida Prize for Drama for his play, Hinemi. In 2005, he was a visiting professor at Waseda University.

Miyazawa died of heart failure in Tokyo on 12 September 2022, at the age of 65.

Plays
Hinemi (1992)
Nyūtaun iriguchi (2007)

References

1956 births
2022 deaths
20th-century Japanese dramatists and playwrights
21st-century Japanese dramatists and playwrights
21st-century Japanese novelists
Japanese theatre directors
Tama Art University alumni
Academic staff of Waseda University
People from Shizuoka Prefecture